The 1996 Washington State Cougars football team was an American football team that represented Washington State University in the Pacific-10 Conference (Pac-10) during the 1996 NCAA Division I-A football season. Led by eighth-year head coach Mike Price, the Cougars compiled a 5–6 record (3–5 in Pac-10, tied for fifth), and were outscored 317 to 314. In late October, Washington State was at 5–2 (3–1, Pac-10), but lost their final four games, all in conference.

The team's statistical leaders included Ryan Leaf with 2,811 passing yards, Michael Black with 948 rushing yards, and Kevin McKenzie with 626 receiving yards.

Schedule

Roster

NFL Draft
Three Cougars were selected in the 1997 NFL Draft.

References

Washington State
Washington State Cougars football seasons
Washington State Cougars football